The Cheney Free Press has been the dominant newspaper of Cheney in the U.S. state of Washington since its inception in 1896. It was not the first newspapers there; the North-West Tribune was published in Cheney from June 1880 to about 1886, and was the second in Spokane County.

It was a Republican paper in its earliest days, but switched its allegiance to the People's Party when purchased in 1898. It has been firmly embedded in its community throughout, devoting a page to local high school student editors in the teens and using its press to print newspapers for various other companies in the region.

Timeline 

 1896 established by three Northwest newspaper veterans (includes W. H. Beyer?) 
 Spencer L. Alexander purchased the paper in May 1898.
 Alexander brothers: Furman and Merrill buy Union Printing Co
 Soon after the purchase, it was announced in a neighboring paper that the Free Press had deserted the Republican party and endorsed the People's Party and the fusion movement.
 In 1912 the Free Press began dedicating one of its six pages to the local high school, whose students assumed editorial control of the page's contents. In that same year the Free Press lost a libel suit worth $1,250, and was joined by other Washington newspapers in its call for the state to update its libel laws.
 1916 G Willis Swank editor
 editor in 1923 (book)
 Vernon R Frost publisher (brother Guyel T Frost)
Part of Medical Lake Press in 1932
 1936 Harry N Beall and Max Schafer buy paper
 1953 Guyel T Frost buys the paper (dies 1968)
 started as printer staff in 1933
 1971-ish Jerald R. Adams editor
 wins 3 awards in news-design division of 1973 BNC
 1981 Jerome 'Jerry' Jantz
 Journal News Publishing purchased the paper along with the Davenport Times in 1989. Previous owners were the Wilbur and Jantz families and the Times Publishing Co. A Free Press circulation of 3,200 was reported at the time.
 Journal News Publishing was controlled by majority partner Jeff Fletcher, owner of the Grant County Journal. Bill Ifft bought Fletcher's interest in 2007. He renamed the company Free Press Publishing; at the time the company owned several weekly newspapers in eastern Washington, including the Spokane Valley News Herald (its largest paper), the Davenport Times, and several specialty publications, and owned 70% of the Ritzville Journal. It had previously had an ownership stake in the Newport Miner and the Grand Coulee Star, but had sold its interest to the local owners. The company planned to buy an additional press to support its own publications and also to serve other publications such as the Adams County Journal, the Wilbur Register, and the Miner.
 Free Press Publishing acquired the Odessa Record and The Whitman County Gazette in March 2020. Both newspapers are published weekly.

References

External links 
 Library of Congress entry
 alt titles - Medical Lake Press
 Cheney Free Press website
 2014 awards
 2015 awards
 2016 awards
 2017 awards

Newspapers published in Washington (state)
Spokane County, Washington